Daniel Russo (born 13 May 1948) is a French film actor, comedian and director.

Theater

Filmography

References

External links
 

1948 births
Living people
Male actors from Marseille
French male film actors
French National Academy of Dramatic Arts alumni